The Malaysian Indian Muslim Congress (abbrev: KIMMA) is a political party in Malaysia which seeks to represent the interests of Muslim people of Indian descent in the country.

History

Formation
KIMMA was formed on 24 October 1976 to represent the interests of the minority Indian Muslim community in Malaysia. Majority members of KIMMA are Indian Muslim. KIMMA was deregistered twice ever in 1978 and 1998 before it was successfully registered back.

Leadership crisis
The party has managed to re-register back again by the Registrar of Societies (RoS) after its registration was cancelled twice in 1978 and 1998.

In 2008, KIMMA went through a leadership crisis when its earlier sacked deputy president, Amir Amsa Alla Pitchay by it president Dato' Syed Ibrahim B. Kader, claimed himself is the president and suggested the merger of KIMMA with People's Progressive Party (PPP), a Barisan Nasional (BN) component party.

In 2009, once again the internal crisis saw KIMMA faced with the problem of two presidents after the validity of the 33rd Annual General Meeting was in doubt and Federal Territory KIMMA president, Mohd Fazil William Abdullah was sacked.

Political affiliation
KIMMA had joined the opposition political parties coalitions Angkatan Perpaduan Ummah (APU) and Gagasan Rakyat (GR) simultaneously before from 1990 to 1995. KIMMA somehow changed its direction after that and declared that it have wish to join Barisan Nasional (BN) since 1984. Due to the coalition constitution which stated all new application will have to be agreed unanimously by all the component parties, it faced the obstacles especially from Malaysian Indian Congress (MIC) and United Malays National Organisation (UMNO) as there may be double-membership in the parties. KIMMA application gets a big objection from MIC. Its BN admission application was never approved. Full BN coalition membership seem unlikely. it is being considered only as a 'Friends of BN' party instead.

UMNO associate membership
The concern and doubt over the status of Malaysian Indian Muslim as Non-Malay and Non-Bumiputra which are also obstacles and objections that had caused KIMMA willingness to passed the motion to demand the Malay status for its community and to apply for KIMMA to be accepted as an associated member of UMNO.

The application of KIMMA to be the associate member instead of UMNO at last was approved by the Supreme Council of UMNO on 27 August 2010. With this approval, KIMMA enjoys the observer status in all the UMNO division meetings and annual general meeting (AGM) but is not allowed to be involved in and interfere with the party matters.

For the first time, the party president, Syed Ibrahim Kader got to be appointed as a Senator for two three-year terms in the 12th and 13th Parliaments from 30 May 2011 to 29 May 2014 and again from 30 May 2014 to 29 May 2017.

KIMMA pledged to carry on supporting and working with UMNO through its Jalinan Rakyat (JR) machinery in the 2022 Johor state election.

2022 Malaysian general election
On 14 October 2022, four days after the dissolution of the 14th Parliament, party president Syed Ibrahim Kader revealed that BN leadership had agreed to nominate a candidate from the party to contest for a "safe" seat in the election, allowing them to make their election debut. He expressed his happiness that the loyalty of the party to BN and their friendships and ties had finally been recognised after 13 years as an UMNO associate member party. In addition, he also likened the seat as a "reward" to the party.On 1 November 2022, BN Chairman and UMNO President Ahmad Zahid Hamidi announced that Syed Ibrahim would contest for the Puchong federal seat.

Leadership
 President
 Datuk Seri Haji Syed Ibrahim Kader
 Deputy President
 Harisirajudin Alaudin 
 Vice Presidents
 Dato Anuar Sadad Bin Haji Mohamed Mustafa 
 Datuk Haji Abdul Wahith Sharfudin 
 Dato Haji Syed Mohd Ali 
 Secretary-General
 Hussein Jamal Mahamad
 Deputy Secretary General
 Mohaideen Abdul Kader (Ashraf) 
 Treasurer
 Jeyalaldeen Mohideen
 Youth Chief
 Mohamed Hafiz 
 Women Chief
 Majunun Meher 
 Puteri Chief
 Rohaini Syed Ibrahim
 Information Chief
 Haji Mohamed Rapheal Zakarudin

General election results

See also
Politics of Malaysia
List of political parties in Malaysia
Parti Perikatan India Muslim Nasional (IMAN)

References

External links
 
 

1976 establishments in Malaysia
Political parties established in 1976
Political parties in Malaysia
Islamic organisations based in Malaysia
Islamic political parties in Malaysia
Conservative parties in Malaysia
Political parties of minorities
Identity politics
Indian-Malaysian culture
Indian National Congress breakaway groups